Chamness is a former unincorporated community in Williamson County, Illinois that disappeared with the establishment of the Ordill in the late 1930s and takeover by the Department of War in 1941 following the Japanese attack on Pearl Harbor. The site of the community is now located within the Crab Orchard National Wildlife Refuge southwest of Marion.

The community was established 24 January 1889 and discontinued 30 April 1902. The name came from the first two postmasters, Marshall E. and Albert E. Chamness. The ZIP Code was 62959.

References

Ghost towns in Illinois
Populated places established in 1889
Populated places in Williamson County, Illinois